Las Provincias is a Spanish language regional newspaper published in Valencia, Spain. Founded in 1886 it is one of the oldest publications in the country.

History and profile
Las Provincias was first published in Valencia in January 1886. The paper is part of the Vocento Group and is published by Federico Domenech SA. The daily has six local editions published in La Ribera, Camp de Morvedre, La Costera, La Safor, La Marina and Castellon. Its sister newspapers include ABC, El Correo Español, El Diario Vasco and La Verdad, all of which are part of the Vocento Group.

Las Provincias has a right-wing political stance. In the 1960s the paper opposed the attempts of intellectuals to revive the culture and language of the region.

The paper has a supplement, namely XL Semanal.

Circulation
Las Provincias sold 58,354 copies in 1993. Its circulation was 42,905 copies in 2002. It was 28,000 copies in 2011. The paper had a circulation of 20,771 copies in 2014.

See also
List of newspapers in Spain

References

External links
  

1886 establishments in Spain
Daily newspapers published in Spain
Grupo Vocento
Mass media in Valencia
Publications established in 1886
Spanish-language newspapers